Sant'Agata del Bianco is a comune (municipality) in the Province of Reggio Calabria in the Italian region Calabria, located about  southwest of Catanzaro and about  east of Reggio Calabria.

The great writer Saverio Strati was born in Sant'Agata del Bianco in 1924. Strati is the author of many books including, "Miti Racconti e Leggende di Calabria" a collection of legends and stories that gives insight into the traditions and culture of the Calabrese, as well as novels and dramas that describe the emigrant experience of the poor from the region.

References

Cities and towns in Calabria